Mississippi School for the Blind (MSB) is a state-operated K-12 public school for blind children located in Jackson, Mississippi, United States.

The Mississippi State Legislature established the Institution for the Instruction of the Blind on March 2, 1848, through Article 9, Chapter 43. The legislature appropriated $2,500 to the operation of the institution.

It has dormitories housing students from outside of the Jackson metropolitan area.

References

External links

 Mississippi School for the Blind

Public high schools in Mississippi
Schools in Jackson, Mississippi
Schools for the blind in the United States
Public middle schools in Mississippi
Public elementary schools in Mississippi
Public K-12 schools in the United States
Public boarding schools in the United States
Boarding schools in Mississippi